The economy of Taiwan is a highly developed market economy. It is the 8th largest in Asia and 18th-largest in the world by purchasing power parity, allowing Taiwan to be included in the advanced economies group by the International Monetary Fund. It is gauged in the high-income economies group by the World Bank. Taiwan is one of the most technologically advanced computer microchip makers in the world.

History 

Taiwan has transformed itself from a recipient of U.S. aid in the 1950s and early 1960s to an aid donor and major foreign investor, with investments primarily centered in Asia. Private Taiwanese investment in mainland China is estimated to total in excess of US$150 billion, and official tallies cite Taiwan as having invested a comparable amount in Southeast Asia.

: during the early Qing Dynasty, the preceding Ming dynasty supporters survived for a brief period of time in exile in Taiwan, and in 1949, as the Chinese Communist Party gained control of mainland China, two million Kuomintang (KMT) supporters fled to the island.

The first step towards industrialization was land reforms, a crucial step in modernizing the economy, as it created a class of landowners with the capital they could invest in future economic endeavors. US aid was also important in stabilizing post-war Taiwan, and it constituted more than 30 percent of domestic investment from 1951 to 1962. These factors, together with government planning and universal education, brought rapid advancements in industry and agriculture, and living standards. The economy shifted from an agriculture-based economy (32% of GDP in 1952) to an industry-oriented economy (47% of GDP in 1986). Between 1952 and 1961, the economy grew by an average of 9.21% each year.

Once again, the transformation of Taiwan's economy cannot be understood without reference to the larger geopolitical framework. Although aid was cut back in the 1970s, it was crucial in the formative years, spurring industrialization, and security and economic links between Taiwan and the United States were maintained. Uncertainty about the US commitment accelerated the country's shift from subsidized import-substitution in the 1950s to export-led growth. The development of foreign trade and exports helped absorb excess labor from the decreased importance of agriculture in the economy. Taiwan moved from cheap, labor-intensive manufactures, such as textiles and toys, into an expansion of heavy industry and infrastructure in the 1970s and then to advanced electronics in the subsequent decade. By the 1980s, the economy was becoming increasingly open, and the government moved towards the privatization of government enterprises. Technological development led to the establishment of the Hsinchu Science Park in 1981. Investments in mainland China spurred cross-strait trade, decreasing Taiwan's dependence on the United States market. From 1981 to 1995, the economy grew at an annual rate of 7.52%, and the service sector became the largest sector at 51.67%, surpassing the industrial sector and becoming a major source of the economy's growth.

International Trade is officially assisted by Taiwan External Trade Development Council. Because of the financial policy by the Central Bank of the Republic of China (Taiwan) and its entrepreneurial strengths, Taiwan suffered little from the financial crisis of 1997-1999 compared to other economies in the region.

Data 
The following table shows the main economic indicators in 1980–2021 (with IMF staff estimates in 2021–2027). Inflation under 5% is in green.

Economy by region

Economic outlook
As of 2021, the three highest-paid sectors in Taiwan include telecommunication service, financial services, and information services. The economy of Taiwan ranked the highest in Asia in the 2015 Global Entrepreneurship Index (GEI). 
With the technocracy-centered economic planning until 1987, real growth in GDP has averaged about 8% during the past three decades. Exports have grown since World War II, with inflation and unemployment staying low and foreign reserves being the world's fourth largest. Directorate-General of Budget, Accounting and Statistics and Ministry of Economic Affairs release major economic indicators of the economy of Taiwan.

Taiwan now faces many of the same economic issues as other developed economies. With the prospect of continued relocation of labor-intensive industries to economies with cheaper workforces, such as in mainland China, the Philippines, and Vietnam, Taiwan's future development will have to rely on further transformation to a high-technology and service-oriented economy. In recent years, Taiwan has successfully diversified its trade markets, cutting its share of exports to the United States from 49% in 1984 to 20% in 2002. Taiwan's dependence on the United States should continue to decrease as its exports to Southeast Asia and mainland China grow, and its efforts to develop European markets produce results. Taiwan's accession to the WTO and its desire to become an Asia-Pacific "regional operations center" are spurring further economic liberalization. The economy of Taiwan is facing economic marginalization in the world economy  de-internationalization and lower salaries. This results in human resource talents seeking career opportunities elsewhere. Businesses in Taiwan suffer most from being the size of small and medium enterprises, which impedes attempts at economic transformation in Taiwan by the Taiwanese government.

The Indirect tax system of the economy of Taiwan comprises Gross Business Receipts Tax (GBRT) (Gross receipts tax) and Value-added tax. The economy of Taiwan is ranked 15th overall in the Global Top 20 Top Destination Cities by International Overnight Visitors (2014) by the MasterCard 2014 Global Destination Cities Index.

2007–2010 global financial crisis 

Taiwan recovered quickly from the global financial crisis of 2007–2010, and its economy has been growing steadily since. Its economy faced a downturn in 2009 due to a heavy reliance on exports which in turn made it vulnerable to world markets. Unemployment reached levels not seen since 2003, and the economy fell 8.36% in the fourth quarter of 2008. In response, the government launched a US$5.6 billion economic stimulus package (3% of its GDP), provided financial incentives for businesses, and introduced tax breaks. The stimulus package focused on infrastructure development, small and medium-sized businesses, tax breaks for new investments, and low-income households. Boosting shipments to new overseas markets, such as Russia, Brazil, and the Middle East, was also a main goal of the stimulus. The economy has since slowly recovered; by November 2010, Taiwan's unemployment rate had fallen to a two-year low of 4.73%, and continued dropping to a 40-month low of 4.18% by the end of 2011. The average salary has also been rising steadily for each month in 2010, up 1.92% from the same period in 2009. Industrial output for November 2010 reached another high, up 19.37% from a year earlier, indicating strong exports and a growing local economy. Private consumption is also increasing, with retail sales up 6.4% compared to 2009. After 10.5% economic growth in 2010, the World Bank expected growth to continue and reach 5% for 2011.

According to the National Development Council, Taiwan's economy declined in May 2019 due to the ongoing China-United States trade war.

Foreign trade
  

Foreign trade has been the engine of Taiwan's rapid growth during the past 40 years. Taiwan's economy remains export-oriented; thus, it depends on an open world trade regime and remains vulnerable to downturns in the world economy. The total value of trade increased over fivefold in the 1960s, nearly tenfold in the 1970s, and doubled again in the 1980s. The 1990s saw a more modest, slightly less than twofold, growth. Export composition changed from predominantly agricultural commodities to industrial goods (now 98%). The electronics sector is Taiwan's most important industrial export sector and is the largest recipient of United States investment.

Taiwan is a member of numerous trade agreements, with China, Japan, USA, the European Union, and Hong Kong as top 5 trade partners in 2010. Taiwan has one of the world's lowest fertility rate and high housing prices. Labor shortages, falling domestic demand, and declining tax revenues are concerns as Taiwan's population decline is faster than other advanced economies.

As an island economy with a lack of natural resources and comparatively lower domestic aggregate demand, Taiwan's highly educated human resources would contribute greatly to Value added Innovation management for expanding Taiwan's international trade.

Taiwan, as an independent economy, became a member of the World Trade Organization (WTO) as Separate Customs Territory of Taiwan, Penghu, Kinmen and Matsu (often shortened to "Chinese Taipei" - both names resulting from PRC interference in the WTO) in January 2002. In a 2011 report by Business Environment Risk Intelligence (BERI), Taiwan ranked third-best globally for its investment environment.

Taiwan is the world's largest supplier of contract computer chip manufacturing (foundry services) and is a leading LCD panel manufacturer, DRAM computer memory, networking equipment, and consumer electronics designer and manufacturer. Major hardware companies include Acer, Asus, HTC, Foxconn, TSMC and Pegatron. Textiles are another major industrial export sector, though of declining importance due to labor shortages, increasing overhead costs, land prices, and environmental protection.

Imports are dominated by raw materials and capital goods, which account for more than 90% of the total. Taiwan imports most of its energy needs. The United States is Taiwan's third largest trading partner, taking 11.4% of Taiwanese exports and supplying 10.0% of its imports. Mainland China has recently become Taiwan's largest import and export partner. In 2010, the mainland accounted for 28.0% of Taiwan's exports and 13.2% of imports. This figure is growing rapidly as both economies become ever more interdependent. Imports from mainland China consist mostly of agricultural and industrial raw materials. Exports to the United States are mainly electronics and consumer goods. As the Taiwanese per capita income level has risen, demand for imported, high-quality consumer goods has increased. Taiwan's 2002 trade surplus with the United States was $8.70 billion.

The lack of formal diplomatic relations between the Republic of China (Taiwan) with Taiwan's trading partners appears not to have seriously hindered Taiwan's rapidly expanding commerce. The Republic of China maintains cultural and trade offices in more than 60 countries with which it does not have official relations to represent Taiwanese interests. In addition to the WTO, Taiwan is a member of the Asian Development Bank as "Taipei, China" (a name resulting from PRC influence on the bank) and the Asia-Pacific Economic Cooperation (APEC) forum as "Chinese Taipei" (for the same reason as above). These developments reflect Taiwan's economic importance and its desire to become further integrated into the global economy.

Taiwan is a member of the Asian Development Bank (ADB), the World Trade Organization (WTO), and the Asia-Pacific Economic Cooperation (APEC). Taiwan is also an observer at the Organisation for Economic Co-operation and Development (OECD) and International Energy Agency (IEA) as Member under the acronym of Chinese Taipei, and a member of International Chamber of Commerce as Chinese Taipei. Taiwan signed Economic Cooperation Framework Agreement with People's Republic of China on 29 June 2010. Taiwan has also signed free trade pacts with Singapore and New Zealand. Taiwan applied for the membership in the Asian Infrastructure Investment Bank in 2015.

The Economic Cooperation Framework Agreement (ECFA) with the People's Republic of China was signed on 29 June 2010, in Chongqing. It could potentially widen the market for Taiwan's exports. However, the true benefits and impacts brought by ECFA to Taiwan's overall economy are still in dispute. The newly signed agreement will allow for more than 500 products made in Taiwan to enter mainland China at low or no tariffs. As of 2021, Taiwan's exports to the People's Republic of China (including Hong Kong) totaled about US$270 billion per year, which is equivalent to more than 40% of Taiwan's total GDP. The government is also looking to establish trade agreements with Singapore and the United States.

Industry

Industrial output has gradually decreased from accounting for over half of Taiwan's GDP in 1986 to just 31% in 2002. Industries have gradually moved to the capital and technology-intensive industries from more labor-intensive industries, with electronics and information technology accounting for 35% of the industrial structure. Industry in Taiwan primarily consists of many small and medium-sized enterprises (SME) with fewer large enterprises. Traditional labor-intensive industries are being moved off-shore and replaced with capital and technology-intensive industries. These industries are in the pre-mature stage of the manufacturing industry in various global economic competitions, and growing from the over-reliance from the original equipment manufacturer and original design manufacturer models. The Institute for Information Industry is responsible for the development of the IT and ICT industry in Taiwan. Industrial Technology Research Institute is the advanced research center for applied technology for the economy of Taiwan. The art industry is significant with sales worth $225.4 million made domestically in 2019. Taiwanese collectors and artists are also prominent in the global art market. Taiwan is a leader in hardware innovation and open data publication.

The "e-Taiwan" project launched by the government seeks to use US$1.83 billion to improve the information and communications infrastructure in Taiwan in five major areas: government, life, business, transport, and broadband. The program seeks to raise industry competitiveness, improve government efficiency, and improve the quality of life, and aims to increase the number of broadband users on the island to 6 million. In 2010, Taiwan's software market grew by 7.1% to reach a value of US$4 billion, accounting for 3.3% of the Asia-Pacific region market value. The digital content production industry grew by 15% in 2009, reaching US$14.03 billion. The optoelectronics industry (including flat panel displays and photovoltaics) totaled NT$2.2 trillion in 2010, a 40% jump from 2009, representing a fifth of the global market share. The economy of Taiwan is a partner in the Global Value Chains of Electronics Industry. Electronic components and personal computer are areas of international strength of Taiwan's Information Technology industry.

Taiwan has a growing startup sector.

Consumer goods 
Taiwan is a major producer of sporting goods with NT$59.8 billion of production in 2020, 40-50% of production is indoor fitness equipment. Taiwan is the global leader in golf equipment with 80% of global production concentrated in the country. The four largest golf OEM are all Taiwanese, however, these firms are increasingly selling products under their own brands.

Semiconductor industry

The semiconductor industry, including IC manufacturing, design, and packing, forms a major part of Taiwan's IT industry. Due to its strong capabilities in OEM wafer manufacturing and a complete industry supply chain, Taiwan has been able to distinguish itself from its competitors. The sector output reached US$39 billion in 2009, ranking first in global market share in IC manufacturing, packaging, and testing, and second in IC design. Taiwan Semiconductor Manufacturing Company (TSMC) and United Microelectronics Corporation (UMC) are the two largest contract chipmakers in the world, while MediaTek is the fourth-largest fabless supplier globally. In 1987, TSMC pioneered the fabless foundry model, reshaping the global semiconductor industry. From ITRI's first 3-inch wafer fabrication plant built in 1977 and the founding of UMC in 1980, the industry has developed into a world leader with 40 fabs in operation by 2002. In 2007, the semiconductor industry overtook that of the United States, second only to Japan. Although the global financial crisis from 2007 to 2010 affected sales and exports, the industry has rebounded with companies posting record profits for 2010. The international industrial forecast of semiconductor manufacturing, which is the flagship industry of the economy of Taiwan that faces immense competition ahead with its American counterparts. By 2020 Taiwan was the unmatched leader of the global semiconductor industry with Taiwan Semiconductor Manufacturing Company (TSMC) alone accounting for more than 50% of the global market.

Information technology

Taiwan's information technology industry has played an important role in the worldwide IT market over the last 20 years. In 1960, the electronics industry in Taiwan was virtually nonexistent. However, with the government's focus on development of expertise with high technology, along with marketing and management knowledge to establish its own industries, companies such as TSMC and UMC were established. The industry used its industrial resources and product management experience to cooperate closely with major international suppliers to become the research and development hub of the Asia-Pacific region. The structure of the industry in Taiwan includes a handful of companies at the top along with many small and medium-sized enterprises (SME) which account for 85% of industrial output. These SMEs usually produce products on an original equipment manufacturer (OEM) or original design manufacturer (ODM) basis, resulting in less resources spent on research and development. Due to the emphasis of the OEM/ODM model, companies are usually unable to make in-depth assessments for investment, production, and marketing of new products, instead relying upon importation of key components and advanced technology from the United States and Japan. Twenty of the top information and communication technology (ICT) companies have International Procurement Offices set up in Taiwan. As a signer of the Information Technology Agreement, Taiwan phased out tariffs on IT products since 1 January 2002.

Taiwan is a hub for global computing, telecommunications, and data management with a number of large server farms operating in the country. Google's data center in Changhua is believed to be the largest in Asia. Taiwan is well connected to the global undersea fiber optic cable network and serves as a substantial traffic interchange.

Agriculture

Agriculture has served as a strong foundation for Taiwan's economic miracle. It contributes 3% to GDP and the service sector makes up 73% of the economy. After retrocession from Japan in 1945, the government announced a long-term strategy of "developing industry through agriculture, and developing agriculture through industry". As such, agriculture became the foundation for Taiwan's economic development during early years and served as an anchor for growth in industry and commerce. Whereas in 1951, agricultural production accounted for 35.8% of Taiwan's GDP, by 2013, it had been vastly surpassed, and it's NT$475.90 billion accounted for only 1.69% of the GDP. , Taiwan's agriculture was a mixture of crops (47.88%), livestock (31.16%), fishery (20.87%), and forestry (0.09%). Since its accession into the World Trade Organization and the subsequent trade liberalization, the government has implemented new policies to develop the sector into a more competitive and modernized green industry.

Although only about one-quarter of Taiwan's land area is suitable for farming, virtually all farmland is intensely cultivated, with some areas suitable for two and even three crops a year. However, increases in agricultural production have been much slower than industrial growth. Agricultural modernization has been inhibited by the small size of farms and the lack of investment in better facilities and training to develop more profitable businesses. Taiwan's agricultural population has steadily decreased from 1974 to 2002, prompting the Council of Agriculture to introduce modern farm management, provide technical training, and offer counseling for better production and distribution systems. Promotion of farm mechanization has helped to alleviate labor shortages while increasing productivity; both rice and sugar cane production are completely mechanized. Taiwan's main crops are rice, sugar cane, fruits (many of them tropical), and vegetables. Although self-sufficient in rice production, Taiwan imports large amounts of wheat, mostly from the United States. Meat production and consumption have risen sharply, reflecting a high standard of living. Taiwan has exported large amounts of frozen pork, although this was affected by an outbreak of hoof and mouth disease in 1997. Other agricultural exports include fish, aquaculture, and sea products, canned and frozen vegetables, and grain products. Imports of agriculture products are expected to increase due to the WTO accession, which is opening previously protected agricultural markets.

Energy

Due to the lack of natural resources on the island, Taiwan is forced to import many of its energy needs (currently at 98%). Imported energy totaled US$11.52 billion in 2002, accounting for 4.1% of its GDP. Although the industrial sector has traditionally been Taiwan's largest energy consumer, its share has dropped in recent years from 62% in 1986 to 58% in 2002. Taiwan's energy consumption is dominated by crude oil & petroleum products (48.52%), followed by coal (29.2%), natural gas (12.23%), nuclear power (8.33%), and hydroelectric power (0.28%). The island is also heavily dependent on imported oil, with 72% of its crude oil coming from the Middle East in 2002. Although the Taiwan Power Company (Taipower), a state-owned enterprise, is in charge of providing electricity for the Taiwan area, a 1994 measure has allowed independent power producers (IPPs) to provide up to 20% of the island's energy needs. Indonesia and Malaysia supply most of Taiwan's natural gas needs. It currently has three operational nuclear power plants. A fourth plant under construction was mothballed in 2014.

Although Taiwan's per capita energy use is on par with neighboring Asian countries, in July 2005 the Ministry of Economic Affairs announced plans to cut 170 million tons of carbon dioxide emissions by 2025. In 2010, carbon dioxide emissions have been reduced by 5.14 million metric tons. In order to further reduce emissions, the government also plans to increase energy efficiency by 2% each year through 2020. In addition, by 2015, emissions are planned to be reduced by 7% compared to 2005 levels.

Taiwan is the world's 4th largest producer of solar-powered batteries and largest LED manufacturer by volume. In 2010, Taiwan had over 1.66 million square meters of solar heat collectors installed, with an installation density that ranks it as third in the world. The government has already built 155 sets of wind turbines capable of producing 281.6 MW of electricity, and additional projects are planned or under construction. Renewable energy accounts for 6.8% of Taiwan's energy usage as of 2010. In 2010, the green energy sector generated US$10.97 billion in production value. The government also announced plans to invest US$838 million for renewable energy promotion and an additional US$635 million for research and development.

Steel and heavy manufacturing
Taiwan, as of 2017, is the world's thirteenth-largest steel exporter. In 2018, Taiwan exported 12.2 million metric tons of steel, a one percent increase from 12.0 million metric tons in 2017. Taiwan's exports represented about 3 percent of all steel exported globally in 2017, based on available data. The volume of Taiwan's 2018 steel exports was one-sixth that of the world's largest exporter, China, and nearly one-third that of the second-largest exporter, Japan. In value terms, steel represented just 3.6 percent of the total amount of goods Taiwan exported in 2018. Taiwan exports steel to more than 130 countries and territories. Over the decade from 2009 to 2019, Taiwan grew its steel exports by 24%. In 2018, the US imported 300,000 metric tons of pipe and tube products. Taiwan has developed a vast export trade to its most proximate neighbors in flat products. Taiwan's stainless steel exports numbered 2018 about 500,000 metric tons.

Taiwan is the fourth largest exporter of machine tools and machine tool components in the world. The greater Taichung area is home to a cluster of machine tool manufacturers.

Taiwanese company Techman Robot Inc. is the world's second largest producer of cobots.

The automotive industry in Taiwan is significant, with Taiwanese firms increasingly invested in automotive electrification; 75% of Tesla, Inc.’s suppliers are Taiwanese.

Maritime industries

In 2017 Taiwan exported one hundred and sixty-two yachts. In 2018 Taiwan was the fourth largest yacht building nation by feet of yacht built after Italy, The Netherlands and Turkey. Taiwan is one of the largest fishing nations on earth and the associated fish processing industry is also significant.

Largest companies 

According to the 2019 Forbes Global 2000 index, Taiwan's largest publicly traded companies are:

According to the 2022 Fortune Global 500 Rankings, Taiwan's largest publicly traded companies are:

Labor policy

Union policies 
The Labor Union Laws, legislated by the Kuomintang (KMT) on the mainland, gave Taiwan workers the right to unionize. However, prior to the democratization of Taiwan, the functions of trade unions were limited under strict regulation and state corporatism. Under the Labor Union Laws, workers were only allowed to be organized at the companies, which means industry level unions were forbidden. Also, only one union could exist within each company or geographical area. Special occupational groups such as teachers were not allowed to unionize. The right to strike and collective bargaining were also hamstrung by law. The Collective Bargaining Agreement in 1930 stipulated that collective bargains were not legally valid without government approval. The democratization in 1986 brought dramatic changes to union participation and policies. Between 1986 and 1992, unionized workers increased by 13%. A number of autonomous, non-official trade unions emerged, including the Taiwan Confederation of Trade Unions (TCTU) which acquired legal recognition in 2000. The amendments to the Labor Union Laws and Collective Bargaining Agreement both became effective in the early 21st century. The amended Labor Union Law lifted the limitations on special occupational groups from collective representation. The Collective Bargaining Agreement Act in 2008 guaranteed trade unions the power to negotiate with employers.

Employment protection 
Taiwan's labor rights and employment protections increased with its democratization progress in the 1980s, and it still has a relatively high level of employment protection compared to other East Asia countries. Implemented in August 1984, Labor Standards Law was the first comprehensive employment protection law for Taiwan workers. Prior to its implementation, the Factory Act was the primary law governing labor affairs, but was ineffective in practice because of its narrow coverage of businesses and issues and absence of penalties for violation. In contrast, Labor Standards Law covered a broader range of businesses and labor affairs and detailed penalties for its violation. It regulated a period of notice before firing employees and also required a higher level of severance payment. Other labor issues were also regulated by the law, including contract, wage, overtime payment, compensations for occupational accidents, etc. Penalties for employer violation were also clear in the law, stating fines and criminal liabilities. Council of Labor Affairs (CLA) was set up on 1 August 1987 to help with labor inspection and the enforcement of the Labor Standards Law.

In Taiwan, companies with at least a single employee have the compulsion to contribute to the insurer's employment service insurance premium. The share of labor insurance is divided into a 7:2:1 ratio between employer, employee, and state. As far as a contribution towards social security, companies should pay at least 6% of the wages of its employees towards the social security.

Active labor market policies 
Active labour market policies were carried out in Taiwan in the late 20th and early 21st centuries as a result of economic structural changes caused by globalization and deindustrialization. Unemployment increased and reached approximately 5% in 2002 and 2009. A set of policies was adopted to help the unemployed and provide jobs. The Employment Insurance Act of 2002 grants income security during unemployment but, at the same time, requires beneficiaries to use all available resources to find jobs. The Multi-Faceted Job Creation Program, first introduced in 1999, creates job in the third sector groups, especially in nonprofit organizations. It subsidizes those companies to provide vocational trainings and job opportunities. The Public Sector Temporary Employment Creation Program directly addressed the 2008 financial crisis. Unlike the Multi-Faceted Job Creation Programs, the Public Sector Temporary Employment Creation Program creates jobs in the government itself. From 2008 to 2009, the government was estimated to create 102,000 job opportunities through that program. A job creation project was also implemented to help young people by subsidizing the hiring of young people in universities and private companies.

Working hours 

On 30 July 1984, Taiwan implemented an eighty-six article Labor Standards Act under Presidential Order No.14069. The act defined the standard work week as 40 labor hours with an eight-hour limit per day, permitting an overtime-included maximum of forty-eight labor hours per week.

Article 25 of the Labor Standards Act upholds there will be no sexual discrimination in the conditions of workers, however, because the Taiwanese culture and thus political economy traditionally "categorizes female employees as naturally marriage- and family-oriented," women are assumed to obtain employment in fields that are limited to these ideals. As a result of feminist ideals becoming more prevalent with women seeking equal work conditions in modern societies such as Taiwan, even marital status policy and immigration policy have been affected as women seek less patriarchal roles to the point where Taiwanese men have sought higher rates of transnational marriages since the 1990s.

Science and industrial parks

In order to promote industrial research and development, the government began establishing science parks, economic zones which provide rent and utility breaks, tax incentives, and specialized lending rates to attract investment. The first of these, the Hsinchu Science Park was established in 1980 by the National Science Council with a focus on research and development in information technology and biotechnology. Over 430 companies (including many listed on TAIEX) employing over 130,000 people are located within the park, and paid in capital totaled US$36.10 billion in 2008. Both Taiwan Semiconductor Manufacturing Company and United Microelectronics Corporation, the world's largest and second largest contract chipmakers, are headquartered within the park. Since 1980, the government has invested over US$1 billion in the park's infrastructure, and further expansion for more specialized parks have been pursued. The Industrial Technology Research Institute (ITRI), headquartered within the park, is the largest nonprofit research organization in Taiwan and has worked to develop applied technological research for industry, including for many of Taiwan's traditional industries (such as textiles).

Following the success of the first park, the Southern Taiwan Science Park (STSP), consisting of the Tainan Science Park and the Kaohsiung Science Park, was established in 1996. In addition to companies, several research institutes (including Academia Sinica) and universities have set up branches within the park with a focus on integrated circuits (ICs), optoelectronics, and biotechnology. The Central Taiwan Science Park (CTSP) was established more recently in 2003. While the CTSP is still under development, many firms (including AU Optronics) have already moved into the park and begun manufacturing operations. Like the other parks, CTSP also focuses on ICs, optoelectronics, and biotechnology, with the optoelectronics industry accounting for 78% of its revenue in 2008. These three science parks alone have attracted over NT$4 trillion (US$137 billion) worth of capital inflow, and in 2010 total revenue within the parks reached NT$2.16 trillion (US$72.8 billion).

The Linhai Industrial Park, established in Kaohsiung in 1960, is a well-developed industrial zone with over 490 companies focusing on other industries including base metals, machinery and repairs, nonmetallic mineral products, chemical products, and food and beverage manufacturing. The Changhua Coastal Industrial Park, located in Changhua County, is a newer industrial cluster with many different industries such as food production, glass, textiles, and plastics.

Industrial and science parks in Taiwan include:
 Central Taiwan Science Park
 Hsinchu Science Park
 Hsinchu Biomedical Science Park
 Nankang Software Park
 Neihu Science Park
 Tainan Science Park
 Southern Taiwan Science Park
 Kaohsiung Science Park
 National Biotechnology Research Park
 Shalun Smart Green Energy Science City

Economic research institutes

 Taiwan Institute of Economic Research
 Chung-Hua Institution for Economic Research
 Institute of Economics, Academia Sinica
 Industrial Technology Research Institute
 Taiwan Livestock Research Institute

Exchange rates

See also
 Banking in Taiwan
 Cement industry in Taiwan
 Defense industry of Taiwan
 List of banks in Taiwan
 List of Taiwanese automakers
 List of companies of Taiwan
List of largest companies in Taiwan
 List of metropolitan areas in Taiwan
 Made in Taiwan
 Taiwan Miracle
 Taiwanese Wave
 Minimum wage in Taiwan
 Taxation in Taiwan
 Transportation in Taiwan
 Taiwan Stock Exchange (TSE)
 Textile industry in Taiwan
 1997 Asian financial crisis

Notes

References

Further reading

 Taiwan ASEAN Studies Center; ASEAN Outlook Magazine; May 2013. Myanmar's Overlooked Industry Opportunities and Investment Climate, by David DuByne

External links
  
 Statistical Information Network of the Republic of China This website serves as a national statistical portal of the Republic of China.
 Taiwan Economic Journal
 Research Center for Taiwan Economic Development

 
Taiwan